The Flatiron  is a rocky, triangular-shaped headland which overlooks the southwest part of Granite Harbour, in Victoria Land, Antarctica. It was charted by the British Antarctic Expedition, 1910–13, under Robert Falcon Scott, who so named it because of its distinctive shape.

References 

Headlands of Victoria Land
Scott Coast